O.V.Peta (or Opivada venkam peta) is a village in Srikakulam district of the Indian state of Andhra Pradesh. It is located in Burja mandal of Srikakulam revenue division.

Demographics 
 census, There are 511 Houses in village. Total Population: 1705. Male: 849, Female: 856. Literates : 836.

References

Villages in Srikakulam district